Leonard "Chink" Alterman (March 8, 1922 – February 6, 2009) was an American professional basketball player. He played for the Denver Nuggets in the National Basketball League and averaged 3.9 points per game. He served in the United States Army during World War II.

References

1922 births
2009 deaths
Amateur Athletic Union men's basketball players
United States Army personnel of World War II
American men's basketball players
Basketball players from Denver
Denver Nuggets (1948–1950) players
Denver Pioneers men's basketball players
Guards (basketball)